Clinkle was a mobile payments company founded in 2012. In 2013 they raised $25 million and the product launched to college students on September 24, 2014.

History 
Clinkle was founded in 2011 by Lucas Duplan, then a computer science student at Stanford University. Duplan had decided to work on mobile payments during a study abroad program in London after his freshman year. Upon returning to Stanford, Duplan received guidance from Mehran Sahami, a professor who taught the university's introductory programming methodology class. Clinkle rented a house in Palo Alto, California using money from Duplan's parents and a summer program through Highland Capital Partners. With approximately a dozen students building the app, it ran a beta test at Stanford in which testers could send payments to each other.

Through VMware co-founder Diane Greene, Duplan met Accel partner Jim Breyer, who became interested in the company after discussing it with Stanford professors and graduate students. Breyer became an investor following his first meeting and product demonstration with Duplan and participated in a round of funding for the company. By June 2013, Clinkle had raised $25 million from a broad range of investors, including Greene, Andreessen Horowitz, Intel Capital, Intuit, Peter Thiel, Owen Van Natta, and Salesforce CEO Marc Benioff. The funding amounted to the largest seed round in Silicon Valley. Shortly after, Duplan moved the 50-person company from Mountain View to San Francisco. In 2016 a photo was leaked of CEO Duplan and Richard Branson burning wads of fake $100 bills.

In October 2013, former Netflix chief financial officer Barry McCarthy became Clinkle's chief operating officer, and two more former Netflix executives later joined as vice presidents. McCarthy left Clinkle after less than 5 months at the company. Near the end of the year, the company laid off a quarter of its employees. In 2015, seven core employees quit and the remaining team was believed to be mostly consultants providing support and no more than 12, down from 70 several years ago. Forbes reported in January 2016 that investors were losing patience with the lack of any market product and were requesting a return of funds.

Product
Clinkle released an app for download on Google Play and the iTunes Store. Clinkle first launched on college campuses and targeted merchants near college campuses. Clinkle announced on September 26, 2013, that after two months of opening their college waitlists, over 100,000 students had signed up despite no clear product description. Until September 2014, the app had very limited functionality and only allowed users to join a waitlist with a launch date of September 2014.

Before launching, the company had released limited information about its product, despite significant press coverage. The product was intended to include a mobile app that served as an online wallet. Wallets would be linked to existing credit cards and bank accounts. A June 2013 report by TechCrunch stated that the app was going to use high-frequency sound to send payments between devices; however, the section was shortly retracted. Clinkle confirmed that the product would not require near field communication, a wireless technology used by Google Wallet and Apple Pay. Clinkle stated that the product would also provide merchants with information about their customers for the purpose of targeted sales promotions.

Despite its initial launch as an alternative payments processing system, it lost its technological edge to new products like Venmo, a peer-to-peer payments app, and later Apple Pay, which achieved what the company had originally set out to do. The company decided to pivot, and launched to the public on September 24, 2014, a new flagship downloadable application aimed at college students.

The launch debuted a Clinkle Card that allowed users to earn rewards for paying at stores and online. After every seventh payment, Clinkle card users were awarded a "Treat" to send to a friend, which had a chance of earning the recipient a free purchase.

References

Further reading
 Business Insider
 TechCrunch

External links

2011 establishments in California
Companies based in San Francisco
Online financial services companies of the United States
Payment service providers
Privately held companies of the United States
Software companies based in the San Francisco Bay Area
Technology companies established in 2011
Defunct software companies of the United States